Indigenous Area may refer to:

 Indigenous Area (Taiwan), administrative divisions in Taiwan with significant populations of indigenous peoples
 Indigenous and Community Conserved Area (ICCA), as defined by United Nations Environment Programme World Conservation Monitoring Centre
 Indigenous Protected Area, a class of protected area used in Australia